Josias Paulo Cardoso Júnior (born 7 November 1981 in Goiânia) is a Brazilian former footballer who played as a midfielder and forward. In the first half of 2011 he was loaned to Romanian Liga I team FC Brașov from the Paraguayan team Sol de América.

References

External links

1981 births
Living people
Brazilian footballers
Brazilian expatriate footballers
Association football midfielders
Expatriate footballers in Paraguay
Sociedade Esportiva Matsubara players
Goiânia Esporte Clube players
Club Olimpia footballers
Club León footballers
Club Sol de América footballers
Club Rubio Ñu footballers
FC Brașov (1936) players
Cienciano footballers
Los Caimanes footballers
Deportivo Coopsol players
Paraguayan Primera División players
Liga I players
Liga MX players
Peruvian Primera División players
Peruvian Segunda División players
Expatriate footballers in Mexico
Expatriate footballers in Peru
Expatriate footballers in Romania
Sportspeople from Goiânia